Wapadsberg Pass, (English: Wagon Tracks Mountain) is a mountain pass situated in the Eastern Cape province of South Africa, on the regional road R61, between Graaff-Reinet and Cradock, Eastern Cape.

Wapadsberg Pass lies on the tarred regional road R61, between Nieu-Bethesda and Cradock, 17 km east of the N9 in the Eastern Cape Province of South Africa. It is named after the Wapadberg (a section of the Sneeuberg mountain range) which it traverses. The Xhosa name for this pass is 'eGolokoqo, an onomatopoeic rendering of the crunching of wagon wheels on the primitive tracks of the 19th century.

References

Mountain passes of the Eastern Cape